Veedu Manaivi Makkal is a 1988 Indian Tamil-language drama film directed by T. P. Gajendran in his directorial debut. The film stars Visu, K. R. Vijaya, Pandiyan and Seetha. It was released on 15 January 1988, and was commercially successful. The film was remade in Kannada as Ganda Mane Makkalu, in Telugu as Illu Illalu Pillalu and in Malayalam as Kudumba Vishesham.

Plot 
Visu is the head of a middle-class family comprising his wife KR Vijaya, two sons – Anand Babu and Ganaga and two daughters – Seetha and Sulochana. They live in a rented place owned by a cruel landlord in Chennai with whom Visu often gets into quarrel. Visu challenges his landlord that he will build a new house in less than three months and vacate his current rented premises. Visu finalises a plot in the outskirts of Chennai and decides to build a house there.

Anand Babu is a dancer and is married to his cousin, but he develops an illegitimate affair with his co-dancer and starts living together. Visu and KR Vijaya try hard to re-unite Anand Babu with his wife which they accomplish successfully after so much struggles. After re-uniting, Anand Babau's wife transforms and prefers to lead a nuclear family away from her in-laws for which Anand Babu agrees as well. Visu and KR Vijaya feel bad about Anand Babu and his wife's decision to leave them.

Sulochana falls in love with their neighbour S.Ve. Shekar. who has been employed in Dubai and had come to Chennai for holidays. Visu learns of his daughter's love and agrees for their wedding. To Visu's shock, S.Ve.Shekar loses his job and starts staying along with Visu and his family which makes Visu angry and shouts at him once. S.Ve. Shekar feels insulted and leaves the home along with his wife.
Seetha falls in love with Pandian who is employed with the landlord but trying to get a good job. Visu's younger son Ganga could not find a job and keeps trying repeatedly.  Finally Ganga gets a job in a company owned by Delhi Ganesh and falls in love with boss' daughter. Ganga also settles with his father-in-law.

Visu accumulates some money and starts building the house, however he further needs some more financing. He decides to get the help from his children, but none of them come for rescue. Sulochana lies that she has already sold her gold necklace which was given by Visu while Ganga demands a sign in a bond paper which shows his lack of trust on his parents.

Seetha is the only daughter who still stays will her parents. KR Vijaya falls sick and passes away. Visu decides to burn her body at the place where he has been building a house. Hearing the news of KR Vijaya's death, their family members – Anand Babu, Ganga and Sulochana rush to see, however, Visu denies permission to allow them having a look at KR Vijaya's dead body. Finally, Seetha and Pandian are united.

Cast 
 Visu as Subbaiah Pillai
 K. R. Vijaya as Lakshmi
 Pandiyan as henchman
 Seetha
 Delhi Ganesh
 T. P. Gajendran
 S. Ve. Shekher as Sigamani
 Ganga as Subbaiah Pillai's younger son
 Anand Babu as Subbaiah Pillai's elder son
 Kuladeivam Rajagopal as Broker Bullet
 Pushpalatha as Jagadamba

Production 
Veedu Manaivi Makkal was the directorial debut of T. P. Gajendran, and was produced by N. Radha under M/S Thenandal Films. Gajendran wrote the screenplay based on a story by T. Durairaj. The story was written in a way that would suit Visu's image.<ref name="vikatan">{{Cite web |date=11 September 2018 |title=அப்போ இயக்குநர்; இப்போ லாட்ஜ் ஓனர்..!" - டி.பி.கஜேந்திரன் 'அப்போ இப்போ' பகுதி 20 |url=https://cinema.vikatan.com/tamil-cinema/interview/136610-t-p-gajendran-speaks-about-his-cinema-career-for-appo-ippo-series.html |url-status=live |archive-url=https://web.archive.org/web/20181017123858/https://cinema.vikatan.com/tamil-cinema/interview/136610-t-p-gajendran-speaks-about-his-cinema-career-for-appo-ippo-series.html |archive-date=17 October 2018 |access-date=17 October 2018 |website=Ananda Vikatan |language=ta}}</ref> Cinematography was handled by Baby Philips, and the editing jointly by N. R. Kittu and Ganesh Kumar.

 Soundtrack 
The soundtrack of the film was composed by Shankar–Ganesh. The lyrics for all songs were written by Vairamuthu except one, which was written by Idhaya Chandran.

 Release and reception Veedu Manaivi Makkal was released on 15 January 1988. The following week, N. Krishnaswamy of The Indian Express felt the film was too similar to the directorial films of Visu like Kudumbam Oru Kadambam, Manal Kayiru, Samsaram Adhu Minsaram and Thirumathi Oru Vegumathi, but praised the performance of K. R. Vijaya, who he said "steals the show". Jayamanmadhan of Kalki'' appreciated the film for its comedy. The film was commercially successful.

References

External links 
 

1980s Tamil-language films
1988 directorial debut films
1988 films
Films directed by T. P. Gajendran
Films scored by Shankar–Ganesh
Indian drama films
Tamil films remade in other languages